The 1987–88 season was the 91st season of competitive football in Scotland.

Notable events
Billy McNeill's second spell back in charge of Celtic began in style as they finished the season by winning the double of the league title and Scottish Cup. The cup triumph was sealed with two late goals from Frank McAvennie, signed in early October from West Ham United, as they had trailed 1–0 to Dundee United.

Rangers, further strengthened with the signing of Englishmen Ray Wilkins and Mark Walters in midfield, had consolation for their failure to repeat title glory in the shape of a League Cup win. They could only finish third in the league, with Hearts finishing second – 10 points adrift of champions Celtic.

The Old Firm league fixture at Ibrox in October 1987, which ended in a 2–2 draw, saw three players red carded. Charges were later brought against four of the players (three from Rangers, one from Celtic) by the Procurator Fiscal. The resulting Court case ended up with Terry Butcher and Chris Woods being convicted of a breach of the peace. Graham Roberts was found Not proven, whilst Frank McAvennie was acquitted.

Rangers enjoyed the longest run in Europe out of all the Scottish clubs, reaching the European Cup quarter finals where they were edged out by Steaua Bucharest.

A reduction of the Premier Division from 12 clubs to 10 saw three clubs (Falkirk, Dunfirmline Athletic and Morton) relegated. The only promotion place went to Division One champions Hamilton Academical.

Scottish Premier Division

Champions: Celtic 
Relegated: Falkirk, Dunfermline Athletic, Morton

Scottish League Division One

Promoted: Hamilton Academical
Relegated: East Fife, Dumbarton

Scottish League Division Two

Promoted: Ayr United, St Johnstone

Other honours

Cup honours

Non-league honours

Senior

Individual honours

Scottish clubs in Europe
Results for Scotland's participants in European competition for the 1987–88 season

Rangers

St Mirren

Aberdeen

Celtic

Dundee United

Scotland national team

Key:
(H) = Home match
(A) = Away match
ECQG7 = European Championship qualifying – Group 7

See also
1987–88 Aberdeen F.C. season
1987–88 Dundee United F.C. season
1987–88 Rangers F.C. season
 Dubai Champions Cup

Notes and references

 
Seasons in Scottish football